The 2010 Formula 3 Sudamericana season was the 24th Formula 3 Sudamericana season. It began on 16 May 2010, at Autódromo Internacional Nelson Piquet in Brasília and ended on 7 November in Interlagos.

After 508 days, the driver Bruno Andrade of Cesario team was declared champion of the Formula Three Sudamericana in 2010, official result was decided in court on 30 March 2012 in Rio de Janeiro. Yann Cunha, was disqualified of the last race, after a collision with Andrade.

Fernando Resende dominated the Sudamericana Light class, winning 14 of the season's 24 races en route to a championship-winning margin of 114 points. Resende avenged main class defeat for Cesário Fórmula, and himself took an overall podium in Caruaru when only two of the six main class starters finished the race. Resende's team-mate Ronaldo Freitas finished as runner-up, taking five class victories and two overall podiums. Third in class was Duarte Ferreira, who started the season with Dragão Motorsport before joining Cesário Fórmula at round three, and took the other five class victories along with a trio of overall third places at Velopark.

Drivers and teams
 All cars are powered by Berta engines, and will run on Pirelli tyres. All teams were Brazilian-registered.

Race calendar and results

Championship Standings
Points are awarded as follows:

References

External links
 Official website

Formula 3 Sudamericana
Sudamericana
Formula 3 Sudamericana seasons
Sudamericana F3